The following lists events that happened during 2010 in Laos.

Incumbents
Party General Secretary: Choummaly Sayasone
President: Choummaly Sayasone
Vice President:  Bounnhang Vorachith
Prime Minister: Bouasone Bouphavanh (until 22 December), Thongsing Thammavong (starting 23 December)

Events
date unknown - 2010 Lao League

December
22 December - Bouasone Bouphavanh resigns and is replaced the next day by Thongsing Thammavong.

References

 
Years of the 21st century in Laos
Laos
2010s in Laos
Laos